Holidays with Pay Convention, 1936 is  an International Labour Organization Convention.

It was established in 1936, with the preamble stating:
Having decided upon the adoption of certain proposals with regard to annual holidays with pay,

Modification 

This Convention was subsequently revised in 1970 by Convention C132 - Holidays with Pay Convention (Revised), 1970.

Ratifications
The convention was ratified by 54 states. Upon the revised version being ratified by various countries, it was thereby subsequently renounced automatically by 17 of those states.

External links 
Text.
Ratifications.

Employee benefits
International Labour Organization conventions
Holidays
Treaties concluded in 1936
Treaties entered into force in 1939
Treaties of the People's Socialist Republic of Albania
Treaties of Azerbaijan
Treaties of Argentina
Treaties of the Byelorussian Soviet Socialist Republic
Treaties of the People's Republic of Bulgaria
Treaties of Burundi
Treaties of the Central African Republic
Treaties of Colombia
Treaties of the Comoros
Treaties of Cuba
Treaties of Ivory Coast
Treaties of Denmark
Treaties of Djibouti
Treaties of the Dominican Republic
Treaties of the Republic of Egypt (1953–1958)
Treaties of the French Third Republic
Treaties of Gabon
Treaties of Georgia (country)
Treaties of the Kingdom of Greece
Treaties of Israel
Treaties of Kuwait
Treaties of Kyrgyzstan
Treaties of the Kingdom of Libya
Treaties of Mali
Treaties of Mauritania
Treaties of Mexico
Treaties of Morocco
Treaties of Myanmar
Treaties of New Zealand
Treaties of Paraguay
Treaties of Panama
Treaties of Peru
Treaties of Senegal
Treaties of Czechoslovakia
Treaties of Slovakia
Treaties of the United Arab Republic
Treaties of Tajikistan
Treaties of Tunisia
Treaties of Uzbekistan
Treaties extended to the Faroe Islands
1936 in labor relations